Karbalayi Mohseni (also Romanized as Karbalāyī Moḩsenī) is a village in Sigar Rural District, in the Central District of Lamerd County, Fars Province, Iran. At the 2006 census, its population was 37, in 8 families.

References 

Populated places in Lamerd County